Albert Joseph Engel (January 1, 1888 – December 2, 1959) was a politician from the U.S. state of Michigan.

Biography
Engel was born in New Washington, Ohio. He attended the public schools in Grand Traverse County, Michigan, and the Central YMCA College in Chicago, Illinois. He graduated from the law department of Northwestern University, Evanston, Illinois, in 1910. He was admitted to the bar the same year and commenced practice in Lake City, Michigan.  He was prosecuting attorney of Missaukee County in 1916, 1917, 1919, and 1920. During World War I, he served as a first lieutenant in the War Department, Washington, D.C., later being promoted to captain and served overseas for twenty-three months, 1917-1919. He served in the Michigan Senate in 1921, 1922, and 1927 to 1932.

In 1934, Engel defeated incumbent Democrat Harry W. Musselwhite to be elected as a Republican from Michigan's 9th congressional district to the 74th to the seven succeeding Congresses, serving from January 3, 1935 – January 3, 1951. He was not a candidate for renomination in 1950, but was an unsuccessful candidate for the Republican gubernatorial nomination.

Engel operated a  tree plantation near Lake City. He died in Grand Rapids and is interred in Lake City Cemetery.

Engel's son, Albert J. Engel, Jr., was a judge on the United States Court of Appeals for the Sixth Circuit.

References

The Political Graveyard

1888 births
1959 deaths
Republican Party Michigan state senators
Northwestern University Pritzker School of Law alumni
People from Crawford County, Ohio
Members of the Early Birds of Aviation
People from Lake City, Michigan
Republican Party members of the United States House of Representatives from Michigan
20th-century American politicians